Maan Coffee is a Korean coffee chain. Their first store opened on 25 December 2010. By 2015, they have expanded to more than 150 stores.

See also

 List of coffee companies
 List of coffeehouse chains

References

External links

Coffee in South Korea
Coffee companies
Agriculture companies of South Korea
2010 establishments in South Korea
Agriculture companies established in 2010
Food and drink companies established in 2010